Ableh (also Romanized as Ābleh) is a village in Tayebi-ye Sarhadi-ye Sharqi Rural District, Charusa District, Kohgiluyeh County, Kohgiluyeh and Boyer-Ahmad Province, Iran. According to the 2006 census, it had a population of 355, in 67 families.

References 

Populated places in Kohgiluyeh County